Vladimiro is a male given name deriving from the Slavic name Vladimir.

Those bearing it include:
 Vladimiro Montesinos (born 1946, in Arequipa), Peruvian intelligence officer
 Vladimiro Schettina (born 1955, in Asunción), Paraguayan football defender
 Vladimiro Roca (born 1942, in Havana), Cuban dissident and leader of the illegal Cuban Social-Democratic Party
 Vladimiro Tarnawsky (born 1939, in Ukraine), Ukrainian-Argentine football goalkeeper
 (Vladimiro) Ariel Dorfman (born 1942, in Buenos Aires), Chilean-American novelist, playwright, essayist, academic, and human rights activist
 Vladimiro (Wladimiro) Guadagno a.k.a. Vladimir Luxuria (born 1965, in Foggia), Italian transgender politician

References

Spanish masculine given names
Italian masculine given names
Slavic-language names